Sir Edmund Pye, 1st Baronet ( – 1673) was an English landowner, Scrivener and politician who sat in the House of Commons from 1661 to 1673.

Pye was the son of Edmund Pye, of Leckamsteed, Buckinghamshire and of St Martin's Ludgate, London, scrivener, and his wife Martha Allen, sister of Alderman Allen of London.

He was created baronet of Leckamsteed on 23 April 1611 and was knighted at Whitehall four days later. After the Civil War, he was voted a delinquent by Parliament and fined £3,065. He acquired the manor and estate of Bradenham, Buckinghamshire, which became his main residence. In 1661, he was elected Member of Parliament for Wycombe in the Cavalier Parliament. 
 
Pye died at the age of about 65 and was buried on 28 April 1673 at Bradenham when the Baronetcy became extinct.

On 6 May 1635, Pye married Catherine Lucas, daughter of Thomas Lucas, who was the sister of Margaret Cavendish, Duchess of Newcastle-upon-Tyne and John Lucas, 1st Baron Lucas of Shenfield. They had two daughters, Elizabeth and Martha. Elizabeth married Charles West, eldest son of the 5th  Baron de la Warr, who died before his father without issue. Martha married John Lovelace, 3rd Baron Lovelace and had issue including Martha, who inherited Bradenham from the Pyes and the title Baroness Wentworth from her paternal grandmother. She was the second wife of the wealthy politician and shipowner Henry Johnson.

References

1607 births
1673 deaths
English MPs 1661–1679
Baronets in the Baronetage of England
English landowners